Joseph Orgeron is an American politician from Louisiana, who is a member of the Louisiana House of Representatives from the 54th district. He is a Republican.

Early life

Orgeron graduated from South Lafourche High School. He earned his bachelor's degree from Nicholls State University, and his master's degree and doctorate in physics from the University of Texas at Dallas. He is an adjunct professor in maritime management at Nicholls State University.

Career

In July 2020, Orgeron ran in a special election to succeed Reggie Bagala, who died in office. Orgeron won the election, and was sworn into office on July 30.

Personal life
Orgeron and his wife, Angela, live in Golden Meadow, Louisiana. They have three daughters. He is a fourth cousin of Ed Orgeron.

References

External links

Living people
People from Lafourche Parish, Louisiana
Nicholls State University alumni
University of Texas at Dallas alumni
Nicholls State University faculty
Year of birth missing (living people)
Republican Party members of the Louisiana House of Representatives